The Classical Journal (CJ) is a quarterly peer-reviewed academic journal of classical studies published by the Classical Association of the Middle West and South.

Print edition 
The journal currently has about 2300 subscribers, including approximately 700 libraries and research institutions.

History 
As described by JSTOR:

The Classical Journal publishes scholarly articles on Greek and Latin language and literature and on all other aspects of classical studies, together with book reviews. Its Forum section features articles devoted to pedagogy. The journal has been published continuously since 1905; over the years the number of issues per volume has varied, but it is now fixed at four.

The editor-in-chief is elected by the membership of the organization for a five-year term (renewable once). As of 2016, the current editor-in-chief is Georgia Irby (William & Mary). Previous editors have been:

Listserv and website 
In May 2007, The Classical Journal began delivering online-exclusive book reviews, professional announcements, and supplemental material through the University of Minnesota's LISTSERV. Book reviews and the Online Forum are indexed at the journal's website.

Ancestry of doctoral degrees wiki 
The website also houses DIADOCHOI, a Wiki-style searchable database dedicated to the ancestry of doctoral degrees in classical studies and closely related fields.

References

External links 
 
 The Classical Journal on JSTOR

Publications established in 1905
Classics journals
Quarterly journals
English-language journals
1905 establishments in the United States